NGC 510 is a double star in the constellation of Pisces.  The stars are separated 8", and located 7' ESE of NGC 499 and 9' WNW of NGC 515.

The RNGC mislabels PGC 5102 as NGC 510.

Observational history 
NGC 510 was discovered by Swedish astronomer Herman Schultz on November 11, 1867. The object was initially considered a "misty" object (a galaxy) based on the observations with research instruments of that time, and was included on the NGC list. Later it became clear that it was a double star.

See also 
 Double star 
 List of NGC objects (1–1000)
 Pisces (constellation)

References

External links 
 
 SEDS

Double stars
Pisces (constellation)
510
Astronomical objects discovered in 1867
Discoveries by Herman Schultz (astronomer)